Widney Manor is a suburb of Solihull in the West Midlands of England.

The area is served by Widney Manor railway station, a golf course and health club.

Solihull